The St. John's Methodist Episcopal Church in Raton, New Mexico is a historic church.  It was built in 1897 and added to the National Register of Historic Places in 1978. The listing included three contributing buildings.

It is a  stone building.  It was built of native red sandstone, originally with a mortar similar to adobe which deteriorated.  In more recently it was repointed with cement and a cement foundation was put into place.

See also

National Register of Historic Places listings in Colfax County, New Mexico

References

Buildings and structures in Colfax County, New Mexico
Methodist churches in New Mexico
Churches on the National Register of Historic Places in New Mexico
Churches completed in 1897
National Register of Historic Places in Colfax County, New Mexico